Flavio Santoro (born 30 November 2001) is a German-Italian footballer who plays as a forward for TSG Backnang 1919.

References

2001 births
Living people
German footballers
Italian footballers
Association football forwards
SG Sonnenhof Großaspach players
3. Liga players
Regionalliga players